His Favourite Collection is a 50 track, 4xCD greatest hits album by Australian country music artist John Williamson. The album was released in August 2016 and peaked at number 9 on the ARIA charts. The album was supported by a national tour between August and November 2016. The lead and only single from the album "Aussie Girls" is a tribute to Australian sports women.

When asked how he selected the 50 tracks, Williamson said "I wanted to do a compilation of love songs because I had one of those years ago but there's been a lot more love songs and better ones, so I've got that. I've always wanted to do a tropical one, so there's another CD called Willo Goes Troppo – which is all my songs about Northern Australia, which tend to have a bit of a calypso feel to it, like "Cape York Peninsula" and those songs. The other one is country music ballads and the other one's a sing-along."

Track listing

Charts

Weekly charts

Year-end charts

Release history

References

2016 greatest hits albums
John Williamson (singer) compilation albums
Warner Music Group compilation albums